The siege of Budapest or battle of Budapest was the 50-day-long encirclement by Soviet and Romanian forces of the Hungarian capital of Budapest, near the end of World War II. Part of the broader Budapest Offensive, the siege began when Budapest, defended by Hungarian and German troops, was encircled on 26 December 1944 by the Red Army and the Romanian Army. During the siege, about 38,000 civilians died through starvation, military action, and mass executions of Jews by the far-right Hungarian nationalist Arrow Cross Party. The city unconditionally surrendered on 13 February 1945. It was a strategic victory for the Allies in their push towards Berlin.

General situation
Having suffered nearly 200,000 deaths in three years fighting the Soviet Union, and with the front lines approaching its own cities, Hungary was by early 1944 ready to exit World War II. As political forces within Hungary pushed for an end to the fighting, Germany preemptively launched Operation Margarethe on 19 March 1944, and entered Hungary.

In October 1944, after successive Allied victories at Normandy and Falaise, and after the collapse of the Eastern Front following the stunning success of the Soviet summer offensive, Operation Bagration, Regent of Hungary Miklós Horthy again attempted to negotiate a separate peace with the Allies. Upon hearing of Horthy's efforts, Hitler launched Operation Panzerfaust to keep Hungary on the Axis side, and forced Horthy to abdicate. Horthy and his government were replaced by "Hungarist" Ferenc Szálasi, led by the far-right National Socialist Arrow Cross Party. As the new right-wing government and its German allies prepared the defense of the capital, IX SS Mountain Corps, consisting of two Waffen-SS divisions, was sent to Budapest to strengthen the city's defense.

Soviet offensive
The besieging Soviet forces were part of Rodion Malinovsky's 2nd Ukrainian Front. Formations that actually took part in the fighting appear to have included the 53rd Army, 7th Guards Army, portions of the 3rd Ukrainian Front, including the 46th Army, and the Romanian 7th Army Corps.

Arrayed against the Soviets was a collection of German Army (Heer), Waffen-SS and Hungarian Army forces. The siege of Budapest was one of the bloodiest sieges of World War II.

Encirclement of Budapest
The Red Army started its offensive against the city on 29 October 1944. More than 1,000,000 men, split into two operating maneuver groups, advanced. The plan was to isolate Budapest from the rest of the German and Hungarian forces. On 7 November 1944, Soviet and Romanian troops entered the eastern suburbs, 20 kilometers from the old town. The Red Army, after a much-needed pause in operations, resumed its offensive on 19 December. On 26 December, a road linking Budapest to Vienna was seized by Soviet troops, thereby completing the encirclement. The Nazi-supported "Leader of the Nation" (Nemzetvezető), Ferenc Szálasi, had already fled from the city on 9 December.

As a result of the Soviet link-up, nearly 33,000 German and 37,000 Hungarian soldiers, as well as over 800,000 civilians, became trapped within the city. Refusing to authorize a withdrawal, Adolf Hitler had declared Budapest a fortress city (Festung Budapest), which was to be defended to the last man. Waffen SS General Karl Pfeffer-Wildenbruch, the commander of the IX Waffen SS Alpine Corps, was put in charge of the city's defenses.

Budapest was a major target for Joseph Stalin. The Yalta Conference was approaching, and Stalin wanted to display his full strength to Winston Churchill and Franklin D. Roosevelt. He therefore ordered General Rodion Malinovsky to seize the city without delay.

During the night of 28 December 1944, the 2nd and 3rd Ukrainian Front contacted the besieged Germans by radios and loudspeakers, and told them about a negotiation for the city's capitulation. The Soviets promised to provide humane surrender conditions and not to mistreat the German and Hungarian prisoners. They also promised that the emissaries' groups would not bring weapons and would appear in cars with white flags.

The next day, two groups of Soviet emissaries appeared as expected. What happened to them later is unclear,(see here) but both leaders of the groups died. One possible version of the events is recounted below.

The first, belonging to the 3rd Ukrainian Front, arrived at 10:00 AM in the Budafok sector and was taken to the headquarters of General Pfeffer-Wildenbruch. Their negotiating effort was a failure; Pfeffer-Wildenbruch refused the surrender conditions and sent the Soviet agents back to the battlefield. While the emissaries were en route to their camps, the Germans suddenly opened fire, killing Captain I. A. Ostapenko. Lieutenant N. F. Orlov and Sergeant Ye. T. Gorbatyuk quickly jumped into a trench and narrowly escaped. Owing to heavy German fire, the Soviets were not able to retrieve Ostapenko's body until the night of 29 December. He was buried at Budafok with full military honors.

The second group of emissaries belonged to the 2nd Ukrainian Front and arrived at 11:00 AM in the Kispest sector. When the emissaries arrived, the German garrison fired at them. The leader of the emissaries, Captain Miklós Steinmetz, appealed for a negotiation, but to no avail. He was killed together with his two subordinates when the German fire struck the Soviet car.

First German relief attempt

The Soviet offensive began in the eastern suburbs, advancing through Pest, making good use of the large central avenues to speed up their progress. The German and Hungarian defenders, overwhelmed, tried to trade space for time to slow down the Soviet advance. They ultimately withdrew to shorten their lines, hoping to take advantage of the hilly nature of Buda. In January 1945, the Germans launched a three-part counter-offensive codenamed Operation Konrad. This was a joint German-Hungarian effort to relieve the encircled garrison of Budapest. Operation Konrad I was launched on 1 January. The German IV SS Panzer Corps attacked from Tata through hilly terrain north-west of Budapest in an effort to break the siege. On 3 January, the Soviet command sent four more divisions to meet the threat. This Soviet action stopped the offensive near Bicske, less than 20 kilometers west of Budapest. The Germans were forced to withdraw on 12 January. They then launched Operation Konrad II on 7 January. The IV SS Panzer Corps attacked from Esztergom toward Budapest Airport to capture it and improve ability to supply the city by air. This offensive was halted near the airport.

Combat in the city

Street fighting in Budapest increased in intensity. Supply became a decisive factor because of the loss of the Ferihegy airport on 27 December 1944, just before the start of the siege. Until 9 January 1945, German troops were able to use some of the main avenues as well as the park next to Buda Castle as landing zones for aircraft and gliders, although they were under constant artillery fire from the Soviets. Before the Danube froze, some supplies could be sent on barges, under the cover of darkness and fog. Food shortages were more and more common and soldiers had to rely on finding their own sources of sustenance, some even resorting to eating their horses. The extreme temperatures also affected German and Hungarian troops. Soviet troops quickly found themselves in the same situation as the Germans had in Stalingrad. They were able to take advantage of the urban terrain by relying heavily on snipers and sappers to advance.

Fighting broke out in the sewers, as both sides used them for troop movements. Six Soviet marines even managed to get to Castle Hill and capture a German officer before returning to their own lines – still underground. Such feats were rare because of ambushes in the sewers set up by the Axis troops using local inhabitants as guides. In mid-January, Csepel Island was taken, along with its military factories, which were still producing Panzerfausts and shells, even under Soviet fire. Meanwhile, in Pest, the situation for the Axis forces deteriorated, with the garrison facing the risk of being cut in half by the advancing Soviet troops. On 17 January 1945, Hitler agreed to withdraw the remaining troops from Pest to try to defend Buda. All five bridges spanning the Danube were clogged with traffic, evacuating troops and civilians. German troops destroyed the bridges 18 January, despite protests from Hungarian officers. One of them was the famous Chain Bridge, dating from 1849.

Second German relief attempt

On 18 January 1945, the IV SS Panzer Corps, whose relocation to the region north-east of Lake Balaton had been completed on the previous day, was again thrown into battle. This was Operation Konrad III. In two days the German tanks reached the Danube at Dunapentele, tearing the Soviet Transdanubian front apart, and by 26 January the offensive had reached a point roughly 25 kilometers from the ring around the capital.

Stalin ordered his troops to hold their ground at all costs, and two Army Corps that were dispatched to assault Budapest were hastily moved to the south of the city to counter the German offensive. German troops got to less than 20 kilometres from the city but were unable to maintain their impetus due to fatigue and supply problems. Budapest's defenders asked permission to leave the city and escape the encirclement. Hitler refused.

German troops could no longer hold their ground; they were forced to withdraw on 28 January 1945, and to abandon much of the occupied territory with the notable exception of Székesfehérvár. The fate of the defenders of Budapest was sealed.

The Battle for Buda

Unlike Pest, which is built on flat terrain, Buda was built on hills. This allowed the defenders to site artillery and fortifications above the attackers, greatly slowing the Soviet advance. The main citadel, (Gellért Hill), was defended by Waffen-SS troops who successfully repelled several Soviet assaults. Nearby, Soviet and German forces were fighting for the city cemetery amongst shell-opened tombs; it would last for several days.

The fighting on Margaret Island, in the middle of the Danube, was particularly merciless. The island was still attached to the rest of the city by the remaining half of the Margaret Bridge and was used as a parachute drop zone as well as for covering improvised airstrips set up in the city center. The 25th Guards Rifle Division operated from the Soviet side in combat on the island (for losses see below).

On 11 February 1945, Gellért Hill finally fell after six weeks of fighting when the Soviets launched a heavy attack from three directions simultaneously. Soviet artillery was able to dominate the entire city and to shell the remaining Axis defenders, who were concentrated in less than two square kilometres and suffering from malnutrition and disease.

Despite the lack of supplies, the Axis troops refused to surrender and defended every street and house. By this time, some captured Hungarian soldiers defected and fought on the Soviet side. They were known collectively as the "Volunteer Regiment of Buda".

After capturing the southern railway station during a two-day bloodbath, Soviet troops advanced to Castle Hill. On 10 February, after a violent assault, Soviet marines established a bridgehead on Castle Hill, while almost cutting the remaining garrison in half.

Breakout and surrender
Hitler still forbade the German commander, Pfeffer-Wildenbruch, to abandon Budapest or to attempt a breakout. But the glider flights (DFS 230) bringing in supplies had ended a few days earlier and parachute drops had also been discontinued.

In desperation, Pfeffer-Wildenbruch decided to lead the remnants of his troops out of Budapest. The German commander did not typically consult the Hungarian commander of the city. However, Pfeffer-Wildenbruch now uncharacteristically included General Iván Hindy in this last desperate breakout attempt.

On the night of 11 February, some 28,000 German and Hungarian troops began to stream north-westwards away from Castle Hill. They moved in three waves. Thousands of civilians were with each wave. Entire families, pushing prams, trudged through the snow and ice. Unfortunately for the would-be escapees, the Soviets awaited them in prepared positions around the Széll Kálmán tér area.

Troops, along with the civilians, used heavy fog to their advantage. The first wave managed to surprise the waiting Soviet soldiers and artillery; their sheer numbers allowed many to escape. The second and third waves were less fortunate. Soviet artillery and rocket batteries bracketed the escape area, with deadly results that killed thousands. Despite heavy losses, five to ten thousand people managed to reach the wooded hills northwest of Budapest and escape towards Vienna, but only 600–700 German and Hungarian soldiers reached the main German lines from Budapest.

The majority of the escapees were killed, wounded, or captured by the Soviet troops. Pfeffer-Wildenbruch and Hindy were captured by waiting Soviet troops as they emerged from a tunnel running from the Castle District.

Aftermath

The remaining defenders finally surrendered 13 February 1945. German and Hungarian military losses were high, with entire divisions having been eliminated. The Germans lost all or most of the 13th Panzer Division, 60th Panzergrenadier Division Feldherrnhalle, 8th SS Cavalry Division Florian Geyer and the 22nd SS Volunteer Cavalry Division Maria Theresa. The Hungarian I Corps was virtually annihilated, as well as the 10th and 12th Infantry Divisions and the 1st Armored Division.

The Soviet forces suffered between 100,000 and 160,000 casualties. The Soviets claimed that they had trapped 180,000 German and Hungarian 'fighters' in the pocket, and declared they had captured 110,000 of these soldiers. However, immediately after the siege, they rounded up thousands of Hungarian civilians and added them to the prisoner-of-war count, allowing the Soviets to validate their previously inflated figures.

Budapest lay in ruins, with more than 80 percent of its buildings destroyed or damaged, with historical buildings like the Hungarian Parliament Building and the Castle among them. All seven bridges spanning the Danube were destroyed.

In January 1945, 32,000 ethnic Germans from within Hungary were arrested and transported to the Soviet Union as forced laborers. In some villages, the entire adult population were taken to labor camps in the Donets Basin. Many died there as a result of hardship and ill-treatment. Overall, more than 500,000 Hungarians were transported to the Soviet Union (including between 100,000 and 170,000 Hungarian ethnic Germans).

With the exception of Operation Spring Awakening (Unternehmen Frühlingserwachen), which was launched in March 1945, the siege of Budapest was the last major operation on the southern front for the Germans. The siege further depleted the Wehrmacht and especially the Waffen-SS. For the Soviet troops, the siege of Budapest was a final rehearsal before the Battle of Berlin. It also allowed the Soviets to launch the Vienna Offensive. On 13 April 1945, exactly two months after the surrender of Budapest, Vienna fell.

Raoul Wallenberg, Sweden's special envoy in Budapest between July and December 1944, had issued protective passports and sheltered Jews in buildings designated as Swedish territory, saving tens of thousands of lives. On January 17, 1945, Wallenberg, who allegedly had links with British, American and Swedish intelligence, was detained by Soviet authorities and taken to Moscow with his Hungarian driver, Vilmos Langfelder. He subsequently disappeared in the USSR and his fate is still unknown.

After the city's surrender, occupying troops forcibly conscripted all able-bodied Hungarian men and youth to build pontoon bridges across the Danube River. For weeks afterward, especially after the spring thaw, bloated bodies piled up against these same pontoons and bridge pylons.

Impact on civilians
According to Krisztián Ungváry, some 38,000 civilians died during the siege: about 13,000 from military action and 25,000 from starvation, disease and other causes. Of this number, 15,000 were killed in mass executions of Jews by the far-right Hungarian nationalist Arrow Cross Party. Although the Soviet staff gave orders prohibiting ill-treatment of prisoners of war and civilians to almost every unit and took harsh measures against the violators, after the end of hostilities Budapest was flooded by Soviet deserters living on pillage and fighting against the Soviet security service and police, and excesses such as looting and mass rape were carried out by Soviets and Hungarian criminals. Despite the fact that the Soviets often took children and entire families under their protection and had a taboo on hurting children, a high number of women and girls were raped, although estimates vary from 5,000 to 200,000. Norman Naimark argues that Hungarian girls were kidnapped and taken to Red Army quarters, where they were imprisoned, repeatedly raped and sometimes murdered. Professor Andrea Pető argues that "uncertain, wild estimates" were used for political purposes in Hungary to divert public attention away from the crimes committed by that country, including rapes committed against Soviet women by Hungarians.

Memoirs and diaries
The events in the Naphegy and Krisztinaváros neighborhoods of Budapest are told in a few surviving diaries and memoirs. Charles Farkas (Farkas Karoly) was born in 1926 and includes his experience during the siege in his memoir Vanished by the Danube: Peace, War, Revolution, and Flight to the West. László Dezső, a 15-year-old boy in 1944, lived at 32 Mészáros Street with his family. This area was heavily attacked because of its proximity to the Southern Railway Station (Déli pályaudvar) and the strategic importance of the hill. Dezső kept a diary throughout the siege. The memoirs of András Németh also describe the siege and the bombing of the empty school buildings which he and his fellow soldiers used as an observation post.

The memoirs of Heinz Landau, Goodbye Transylvania, present a German soldier's view of the battle. Pinball Games: Arts of Survival in Nazi and Communist Eras, written by George F. Eber, a richly detailed account of a 20-year-old Hungarian and his family living through the siege, was published posthumously in 2010. It chronicles the clever strategies employed for survival and outlined the boredom and terror of a family that was trapped, but would not capitulate. Eber, who had become an internationally known architect, included sketches with the memoir. One of them depicts a Russian soldier silhouetted against a Budapest wall on the first night the Germans were driven out of his neighborhood. The memoir also includes an account of World War II and the post-war transition of the country into Soviet-style Communism.

The memoirs of the 14-year-old dispatch runner of the Vannay Volunteer Battalion, Ervin Y. Galantay, give an insight into the battle and urban combat. The diary of the young runner describes day-to-day life and survival of both civilians and soldiers. It was published in English by the Militaria press in Budapest in 2005, under the title Boy Soldier.

Joseph Szentkiralyi, who had worked in the United States prior to World War II, had been deported to Hungary as an enemy alien after the war began. During the siege, he and his family endured constant artillery bombardment and street-by-street tank and infantry battles between the Germans, the remnants of the Royal Hungarian Army, and the attacking Romanian, and Soviet forces. Szentkiralyi, wanted for questioning by Hungarian army officers, hid on the upper floors of buildings during bombing raids to avoid capture. To prevent starvation and help keep their families alive, Szentkiralyi and others risked their lives to leave their bomb shelters at night and butcher frozen horse carcasses they found in the streets. At the end, daily rations consisted of melted snow, horse meat, and 150 grams of bread. Szentkiralyi worked for the Allies after the war ended. Learning that he faced imminent arrest, he fled to Switzerland to avoid detention and likely execution by the Soviets.

See also
 Budapest offensive
 Forced labor of Hungarians in the Soviet Union
 Hospital in the Rock
 Budapest Ghetto

Notes

References

Bibliography

Further reading

 
 
 
 
  
 
 
 

Battles and operations of the Soviet–German War
Sieges involving the Soviet Union
Sieges involving Germany
Sieges involving Romania
Sieges involving Hungary
Battles and operations of World War II involving Germany
Battles of World War II involving Hungary
Battles of World War II involving Romania
History of Budapest
Urban warfare
Hungary–Soviet Union relations
1944 in Hungary
1945 in Hungary
1940s in Budapest
Sieges of World War II
December 1944 events
January 1945 events in Europe
February 1945 events in Europe
Encirclements in World War II